The 2000 24 Hours of Le Mans was the 68th Grand Prix of Endurance, and took place on 17 and 18 June 2000.

Pre-race
After the 1999 race, most of the manufacturers in the top classes went in different directions. BMW and Toyota went into Formula One, while Mercedes-Benz left sportscar racing after the CLR accidents, returning to the DTM.  Nissan also left due to financial difficulties.  Other than the French privateers Pescarolo, Oreca and DAMS, only Audi and Panoz remained from the previous year, while newcomer Cadillac joined.

Race notes
The 1-2-3 finish of the Audi LMP900s marked the beginning of two dynasties, Audi's and Tom Kristensen's in the top-finishing Audi.

The Oreca team's GTS class winning, seventh place, 333 lap finish with the Chrysler Viper was the best ever with that car.  It faced serious competition within its class from Corvette Racing's new C5.R., which would within the next two years top the Viper's distance record and establish itself as the car to beat among the GT classes.

Official results

† - #83 Dick Barbour Racing was disqualified for an illegally sized fuel tank in post-race inspection.

Statistics
 Pole Position — Allan McNish, #9 Audi Sport Team Joest - 3:36.124
 Fastest Lap — Allan McNish, #9 Audi Sport Team Joest - 3:37.359
 Distance - 5007.99 km
 Average Speed - 207.00 km/h
 Highest Trap Speed — Audi R8 - 337 km/h (race)

Le Mans
24 Hours of Le Mans
24 Hours of Le Mans races